Donald Roy may refer to:
 Donald Francis Roy (1909–1980), American sociologist
 Donald Whatley Roy (1881–1960), British obstetrician and gynaecologist
 Donald William Roy (1908–1997), British Commando officer